Sibynophis triangularis, commonly known as the triangle many-tooth snake or triangulate collared snake, is a nonvenomous species of colubrid snake found in Thailand
and Cambodia.

References

Sibynophis
Reptiles of Thailand
Reptiles of Cambodia
Reptiles described in 1958
Taxa named by Edward Harrison Taylor